County Line station is an light rail station in Lone Tree, Colorado, United States. It is served by the E and R Lines, operated by the Regional Transportation District (RTD), and was opened on November 17, 2006. It serves Park Meadows Mall and features a public art sculpture entitled Plow, created by Emmett Culligan and dedicated in 2006.

The station did not allow direct pedestrian access to the Park Meadows Mall, west of the station, until 2008.

References 

RTD light rail stations
Railway stations in the United States opened in 2006
2006 establishments in Colorado
Transportation buildings and structures in Douglas County, Colorado